The Great Synagogue of Grodno, located in Grodno, Belarus, dates from the 16th century and is a 2007 candidate for UNESCO World Heritage Site.

History
The Great Synagogue of Grodno was built from 1576 to 1580 by Santi Gucci, who designed a wooden synagogue at Rabbi Mordechai Yoffe's invitation. In 1887, the Grodno Jews owned 88% of the commercial enterprises, 76% of the factories and workshops, and over 65% of the real estate in the city. Their property was estimated at 842,000 roubles at a time when the total sum of the city's properties was 1,202,000 roubles. In 1898, one of the first savings and loan cooperatives in Russia was founded in Grodno. 

The synagogue burned down in 1902. Under the supervision of Iya Frunkin, the Jewish community built another synagogue in the eclectic and Moorish style from 1902 to 1905.  By 1907, the city boasted a state Jewish school, a girls' school, a craft shelter, a Talmud-Yeshiva, 107 Jewish primary schools, and 5 elementary schools for girls. This was unique in Russia.

There were also two Jewish libraries and several Jewish charitable organizations working in the city. 

Jews played a very significant role in city life as industrialists, merchants, craftsmen, owners of printing houses, doctors, and teachers. There was said to be a special "Grodno Aura," created by its cultured and intelligent population. For this reason Grodno was considered to be one of the Jewish intellectual capitals of Europe. 

The Jews of Grodno became known around the world, especially: 

artist Léon Bakst
sculptor Ilya Gintsburg
the founder of Esperanto L. L. Zamenhof
the composer of Papirossen Herman Yablokoff (born Chaim Yablonik)
the Hebrew translator Avram-Shalom Friedberg (Авроом-Шолом Фридберг).

The interior of the synagogue was vandalized in 1941 by Nazis. Soviet authorities closed the synagogue in 1944. The synagogue was returned to the Jewish community in 1991; however, it remains in disrepair.

Gallery

See also
Synagogue on Socialist Street (синагога на ул. Социалистической)
Synagogue on Antonova Street, (formerly Jerusalem Street, Grodno) (синагоги на ул. Антонова, бывшей Иерусалимской)

References

External links

 The official site of the Great Synagogue of Grodno
 Great Synagogue (Grodno)

Buildings and structures in Grodno Region
Jews and Judaism in Grodno
Orthodox Judaism in Belarus
Synagogues in Belarus
Synagogues completed in 1905
Orthodox synagogues
Moorish Revival synagogues
Gothic Revival synagogues
1576 establishments